Michael L. Runnels (September 11, 1945 – February 5, 2015) was an American politician and lawyer.

Born in Magnolia, Arkansas to Harold and Dorothy Runnels, he grew up in Lovington, New Mexico and graduated from Lovington High School. He received his bachelor's degree Colorado College and then went to the University of Texas. Runnels then went to University of Texas School of Law and received his Juris Doctor degree. Runnels served on the Santa Fe, New Mexico City Council from 1976 to 1980 and then served as district attorney from 1993 to 2000. He ran unsuccessfully in 1986 and 2000 for his father's Congressional seat. From 1983 to 1987, Runnels served as lieutenant governor of New Mexico and was a Democrat. Runnels died at his home in Ruidoso, New Mexico.

Notes

1945 births
2015 deaths
People from Magnolia, Arkansas
People from Lea County, New Mexico
Colorado College alumni
University of Texas alumni
University of Texas School of Law alumni
New Mexico Democrats
New Mexico lawyers
New Mexico city council members
Lieutenant Governors of New Mexico
People from Santa Fe, New Mexico
People from Ruidoso, New Mexico
20th-century American lawyers